"Flowers" is a song by American singer Miley Cyrus. It was released on January 12, 2023, through Columbia Records as the lead single from Cyrus's eighth studio album, Endless Summer Vacation (2023). The song was a massive commercial success, setting several records. It broke the record as the most streamed song in a week on Spotify during both its first and second week. It debuted atop the Billboard Global 200 chart and reached number one in 36 countries, including the United States and the United Kingdom.

Production and release
"Flowers" was written by Miley Cyrus, Gregory "Aldae" Hein and Michael Pollack in January 2022 in Sunset Sound Recorders studio in Hollywood, California. Pollack said: "We started with the chorus and, if I remember correctly, the lyric, melody, and progression started to form simultaneously. It's one of those 'circle of fifths' songs where the melody informs the progression and vice versa. It practically wrote itself." The initial demo version of the song was a stripped-back ballad, only consisting of Cyrus singing and Pollack playing the Rhodes piano. Then it evolved into the uptempo song. Its final version was produced by Tyler Johnson and Kid Harpoon.

On December 31, 2022, while hosting her NBC live special Miley's New Year's Eve Party, Cyrus announced the release date of "Flowers" for January 13, 2023. However, the song was released on January 13 at midnight UTC+00:00, which was still January 12 in some parts of the world. The demo version of song was released digitally on March 3, 2023. It was also included on the digital version of Endless Summer Vacation album.

Composition

"Flowers" is a pop song with disco and funk influences. Anna Gaca of Pitchfork described it as a "twangy" disco funk song with a string section reminiscent of flamenco. Gabrielle Sanchez of Yahoo! said, "A funky bassline guides the song, paired with a swooning string line and fizzy cymbals". Mary Siroky of Consequence thought that Cyrus's "raspy vocals offer an edge to the disco-toned anthem" and that the song interpolates Gloria Gaynor's "I Will Survive" (1978). She further opined that "Flowers" sounds like "if the hazy, peaceful California tone of 'Malibu' were to be applied to a dance pop track". Alexis Petridis of The Guardian noted its "shimmering electric guitar and understated yacht-rock mood," comparing it to Fleetwood Mac's 1977 album Rumours.

Gabrielle Sanchez of Yahoo! called "Flowers" "a spunky track about flaunting one's self-reliance and independence, no longer depending on someone else to feel complete". Anna Gaca from Pitchfork described it as a "revenge anthem". Mary Siroky of Consequence felt that Cyrus is "embracing her story as her own, stepping into her autonomy in a fully realized way". Dale Maplethorpe of Gigwise felt that "the theme of the song is self-love and acceptance". Jason Lipshutz of Billboard compared the song to Cyrus' 2019 single "Slide Away", adding that "Flowers" "focuses far more on self-sustainability than revenge, trading the melancholy of a song like ... 'Slide Away' for a more assertive outlook". The song's chorus is a paraphrase of Bruno Mars' "When I Was Your Man" (2012). Following its release, several publications suggested that "Flowers" was supposed to be a response song directed at Cyrus' ex-husband Liam Hemsworth. It was released on Hemsworth's birthday, and the lyrics reference their Malibu, California home which burned down in November 2018 during the Woolsey Fire. Hemsworth had reportedly dedicated "When I Was Your Man" to Cyrus in the past.

Critical reception 
"Flowers" received favorable reviews from music critics, with many complimenting Cyrus' vocal delivery. According to Billboards Jason Lipshutz, the single is not a "full-blown reinvention" for Cyrus, but "sturdy, hummable pop, and it captivates without bells or whistles." The New York Times Lindsay Zoladz described the song as "breezy" and opined that "the relatively subdued chorus melody may not demand much of Cyrus, but her vocals are imbued with a laid-back maturity and convincing self-assurance". Consequences Mary Siroky was appreciative of the song and Cyrus, writing that the singer "has played with genre extensively throughout her career, and it's probably because her voice just sounds good in every single one of them." She went on to add to the praise, stating that "once the chorus [in 'Flowers'] hits, she arrives at the conclusion that everything is going to be okay, and there's even a strong chance she'll be better off going forward: 'I can take myself dancing/ And I can hold my own hand/ Yeah, I can love me better than you can'." She also gave the song their "Song of the Week" status. The Daily Telegraph Neil McCormick called it "sophisticated perfection."

Dale Maplethorpe of Gigwise felt that Cyrus' "incredibly recognizable voice chiming in and sounding fantastic" and noted that in the chorus "we hear a funky bassline and killer drums that don't leave the listener with much else to do other than bust a move". However, he felt that the song "does feel like it doesn't build as much as it could do" and "is lacking in the big finish that it seems to tease". Writing for Pitchfork, Anna Gaca described the single as "generic", and Cyrus' vocal delivery as "sincerely unbothered". Gaca further negatively compared the song to "Shakira: Bzrp Music Sessions, Vol. 53", stating that "calling it revenge is a reach, not when Shakira is ready to call you a Twingo: What we're really dealing with here is self-help" implying that the latter addressed the revenge topic in a better way.

Commercial performance 
Upon its release "Flowers" broke several records of the streaming service Spotify. During its first full seven days (January 13–20, 2023) the song earned 96,032,624 plays in Spotify globally, becoming the biggest week for a song in the platform's history (previously the record was held by Adele's "Easy on Me" with over 85 million streams). In the next seven days (January 21–27, 2023) it earned 115,156,896 plays, breaking the record again. It also became the fastest song to cross 100 million plays on Spotify globally (seven days), breaking the record previously held by BTS' "Butter" in eight days. Jana Coffey, Spotify's artist and label partnerships leader, noted that the popularity of "Flowers" had been growing day-after-day, while streaming numbers for other record-breaking songs were the largest on their first days and then declined throughout the week.

"Flowers" spent seven weeks on top of the Billboard Global 200 and Billboard Global Excl. US charts, becoming Cyrus' first number-one single on both charts since their launch in September 2020. During its first three weeks it gained 179.1, 217.1 and 185.6 million streams worldwide consecutively, which became the fifth, second and fourth biggest weeks ever for a song in the Billboard Global 200's history. It also became the first song since the Kid Laroi and Justin Bieber's "Stay" in October 2021 to gain over 100 million global streams for at least seven weeks in a row and the first in the chart's history to do it in seven debut weeks.

North America 
During the first five hours of availability on January 12, 2023, "Flowers" gained 685,000 streams, 2.4 million radio airplay audience impressions and 2,000 digital downloads sold and debuted at number 21 on the Digital Song Sales chart. After its first full week (January 13–19) "Flowers" debuted atop the Billboard Hot 100, becoming the 65th song to do so, Cyrus' second number-one single after "Wrecking Ball" in 2013 and her 11th top ten entry. Due to garnering 52.6 million streams, 33.5 million radio airplay audience impressions and 70,000 digital downloads sold, it debuted atop the Streaming Songs, rose to number one of the Digital Song Sales and debuted at number 18 of the Radio Songs. The same week, Cyrus reached her career top of number three on Billboard Artist 100 chart and her back catalog had an increase of 65% in streaming in the United States. "Flowers" spent its first six weeks on the first place of Hot 100. It became the highest streamed song in a week since Drake's "Way 2 Sexy" in September 2021 due to 59.8 million streams in its second week, as well as the first song with two consecutive weeks of at least 50 million streams since Olivia Rodrigo's "Drivers License" in January 2021, the first non-holiday song with three consecutive weeks of at least 40 million streams since Olivia Rodrigo’s "Good 4 U" in June 2021 and the first song to sell over 30,000 in three consecutive weeks since Coldplay and BTS’s "My Universe" in October 2021.

After one month of release in the United States, "Flowers" became Cyrus' 11th biggest hit in total radio airplay audience due to 233 million impressions and her 13th biggest in on-demand streaming due to 182 million streams. In its fifth week it topped the Radio Songs and Pop Airplay charts. It became Cyrus' first number one single on Radio Songs and the fourth song to top it in five weeks at most since it became an all-format chart in December 1998. It also became the 13th song in history to top Pop Airplay in five weeks at most. In its sixth week it became Cyrus' first number one song on Adult Pop Airplay and Dance/Mix Show Airplay charts.

In Canada, "Flowers" spent its debut eight weeks atop the Canadian Hot 100, becoming Cyrus's second number-one single after "Wrecking Ball" in 2013. It also became her first number-one single on All-format Airplay and Hot AC Airplay charts, as well as her second on Digital Song Sales, CHR/Top 40 Airplay and AC Airplay charts.

International 
The song topped national charts in most European countries, including Austria, Belgium (both Flanders and Wallonia), Bulgaria, Croatia (both Airplay Radio Chart and Croatia Songs), Czech Republic, Denmark, Finland, France, Germany, Greece, Hungary, Iceland, Ireland, Latvia, Lithuania, the Netherlands (both Dutch Top 40 and Single Top 100), Norway, Poland (both streaming and airplay charts), Portugal, Romania, Russia, Serbia, Slovakia, Sweden, Switzerland and the United Kingdom. In the United Kingdom, "Flowers" debuted atop the UK Singles Chart with 92,000 chart units, partially due to 9.9 million streams, which was the biggest first week overall since Harry Styles' "As It Was" in April 2022. The song has topped the chart for nine consecutive weeks, becoming Cyrus' third number-one song in Britain after "We Can't Stop" and "Wrecking Ball" (both from 2013) and her first to remain at top for longer than one week. It became the longest-running number-one single by a female artist on the chart since Olivia Rodrigo's "Drivers License" in 2021. On March 10, 2023, the song was certified Platinum by the British Phonographic Industry for shipment of 600,000 units. In Germany, "Flowers" debuted at number two on the Offizielle Deutschen Singles Charts and climbed to the top position in the second week, becoming Cyrus' first chart-topper in the country. Also in France "Flowers" debuted at number two on the Top Singles chart and climbed to the top position in the second week, becoming Cyrus' first chart-topper in the country.

Outside Europe, "Flowers" topped the charts in Australia, Israel, New Zealand, Paraguay, Philippines, Singapore, South Africa, and Vietnam, as well as the overall MENA streaming chart and the overall Commonwealth of Independent States airplay chart. In Australia, it amassed over 5 million streams in its first week, breaking the first week record in the country's history. The song spent its first nine weeks atop the ARIA Singles Chart, making it Cyrus' first chart-topper in Australia. On March 3, 2023, the song was certified double Platinum by the Australian Recording Industry Association for shipment of 140,000 units.

Music video
The January 12, 2023 release of the single, "Flowers", was accompanied by its music video. It was directed by Jacob Bixenman, with cinematography by Marcell Rév. The video's opening uses panorama-view footage of Los Angeles above the downtown skyline. Cyrus enters by strutting across a bridge in Elysian Park. Vogue classified Cyrus dressed in vintage gold lamé gown from the Yves Saint Laurent Autumn/Winter 1991–92 collection, accessorized with square Saint Laurent sunglasses, noting that "somewhere in the metaphorical vintage hall of fame, a second-life savant is affixing a plaque with Miley Cyrus's name to the wall". Hello! reported that her black underwear has generated trending online searches for "black lingerie sets", with search numbers increasing 413% following the release of the "Flowers" music video on January 13, 2023.

Live performance
Cyrus performed "Flowers" live for the first time, in the documentary concert special, Miley Cyrus – Endless Summer Vacation (Backyard Sessions), which was released on Disney+ on March 10, 2023.

Credits and personnel
Credits adapted from Tidal, Pitchfork and the liner notes of Endless Summer Vacation.

Recording
 Recorded at Ridgemont High, Los Angeles.
 Mixed at Windmill Lane Studios, Dublin.
 Mastered at Sterling Sound, Edgewater.

Personnel
 Miley Cyrus – vocals, songwriting, executive production, vocal percussion
 Kid Harpoon – production, bass guitar, drums, percussion, guitar, synthesizer
 Gregory Aldae Hein – songwriting
 Tyler Johnson – production, guitar, Wurlitzer keyboards, synthesizer
 Joe LaPorta – mastering engineering
 Rob Moose – string arrangement, violin, viola
 Michael Pollack – songwriting, Rhodes piano
 Brian Rajaratnam – engineering
 Doug Showalter – keyboards
 Mark "Spike" Stent – mixing engineering
 Matt Wolach – assistant engineering

Charts

Weekly charts

Monthly charts

Certifications

Release history

See also 

List of Billboard Global 200 number ones of 2023
List of Billboard Hot 100 number ones of 2023
List of Billboard Hot 100 top-ten singles in 2023
List of Billboard Hot 100 number-one singles of the 2020s
List of Billboard Streaming Songs number ones of 2023
List of Billboard Digital Song Sales number ones of 2023
List of number-one singles of 2023 (Australia)
List of number-one hits of 2023 (Austria)
List of Canadian Hot 100 number-one singles of 2023
List of Dutch Top 40 number-one singles of 2023
List of number-one digital songs of 2023 (Canada)
List of number-one singles of 2023 (Croatia)
List of number-one songs of the 2020s (Czech Republic)
List of number-one hits of 2023 (Denmark)
List of number-one hits of 2023 (France)
List of top 10 singles in 2023 (France)
List of number-one hits of 2023 (Germany)
List of number-one singles of the 2020s (Hungary)
List of number-one singles of 2023 (Finland)
List of number-one singles of 2023 (Ireland)
List of number-one singles from the 2020s (New Zealand)
List of number-one songs in Norway
List of number-one singles of 2023 (Poland)
List of number-one songs of the 2020s (Slovakia)
List of number-one singles of the 2020s (Sweden)
List of number-one hits of 2023 (Switzerland)
List of UK Singles Chart number ones of 2023
List of UK top-ten singles in 2023
List of Ultratop 50 number-one singles of 2023

References

External links
 
 
 
 
 
 
 
 

2023 singles
2023 songs
Miley Cyrus songs
American disco songs
American funk songs
Billboard Global 200 number-one singles
Billboard Global Excl. U.S. number-one singles
Billboard Hot 100 number-one singles
Canadian Hot 100 number-one singles
Columbia Records singles
Dutch Top 40 number-one singles
Irish Singles Chart number-one singles
Number-one singles in Australia
Number-one singles in Austria
Number-one singles in Denmark
Number-one singles in Finland
Number-one singles in Germany
Number-one singles in Greece
Number-one singles in New Zealand
Number-one singles in Norway
Number-one singles in the Philippines
Number-one singles in Poland
Number-one singles in Russia
Number-one singles in Singapore
Number-one singles in Sweden
Number-one singles in Switzerland
SNEP Top Singles number-one singles
Song recordings produced by Kid Harpoon
Song recordings produced by Tyler Johnson (musician)
Songs written by Gregory Hein
Songs written by Michael Pollack (musician)
Songs written by Miley Cyrus
UK Singles Chart number-one singles
Ultratop 50 Singles (Flanders) number-one singles
Ultratop 50 Singles (Wallonia) number-one singles